Goodworth Clatford (formerly Goodworth and Lower Clatford which then joined) is a village located in Hampshire, England. It is south of the town of Andover in the valley of the River Anton. The neighbouring village to the north is Upper Clatford, to the south, Fullerton.

A warm community that share various activities including bellringing, a gardening society, an efficient neighbourhood watch scheme, and various events at the central village Club.

Services 
The village has a variety of services, from a tennis club with two popular tennis courts, Brownies and Guides, scouts, a large park, Riverside nature area, two pubs (the Royal Oak and The Clatford Arms), a primary school, Clatford CofE Aided Primary, which has seven classes and draws in pupils even from the large town of Andover nearby, a village shop run by the village community (which includes a Post Office), and the Village Hall.

Education

State
Primary:
 Clatford C E Primary School

References

External links

 Goodworth Clatford Tennis Club
 Goodworth Clatford website

Villages in Hampshire